Wu Yize (born 14 October 2003) is a Chinese professional snooker player.

Career
Wu Yize won the IBSF U-21 World Championship in 2018 when he was just fourteen years old, defeating Pongsakorn Chongjairak from Thailand 6–4 in the final.

Wu Yize was given a wildcard entry to the 2019 International Championship in Daqing where he lost 6–5 to John Higgins. Wu made the last 32 of the 2019 Six-red World Championship in Bangkok, after progressing through the group stage. He then faced Higgins once again, this time losing out 6–4. At the 2019 World Open in Yushan, he faced Luca Brecel losing 5-2 but impressing with a break of 85 and a century of 130.

He was awarded a tour card for the 2021–22 and 2022–23 World Snooker Tour seasons as a result of his performances on the 2021 CBSA China Tour.

At the 2022 European Masters in August, 2022 Wu Yize defeated Luca Brecel, Rory McLeod and Ryan Day in a run through to the quarter-finals that was ended by Ali Carter.

Performance and rankings timeline

Career finals

Amateur finals: 1 (1 title)

References

Chinese snooker players
Living people
2003 births
21st-century Chinese people